Oklo is a region near the town of Franceville, in the Haut-Ogooué province of the Central African country of Gabon. Several natural nuclear fission reactors were discovered in the uranium mines in the region in 1972.

History
Gabon was a French colony when prospectors from the French Alternative Energies and Atomic Energy Commission (the industrial parts, which later became Orano Cycle) discovered uranium in the remote region in 1956. France immediately opened mines operated by Comuf near Mounana village to exploit the vast mineral resources, and the State of Gabon was given a minority share in the company.

For 40 years, France mined uranium in Gabon. Once extracted, the uranium was used for electricity production in France and much of Europe. Today the uranium deposits are exhausted, and the mine is no longer worked. Currently, mine reclamation work is ongoing in the region affected by the mine operations.

Some of the mined uranium was found to have a lower concentration of uranium-235 than expected, as if it had already been in a reactor. When geologists investigated they also found products typical of a reactor. They concluded that the deposit had been in a reactor: a natural nuclear fission reactor, around 1.8 to 1.7 billion years BP – in the Paleoproterozoic Era during Precambrian times. At that time the natural uranium had a concentration of about 3% 235U, and could have reached criticality with natural water as neutron moderator allowed by the special geometry of the deposit.

See also
 Oklo Mine
 Deep geological repository
 List of uranium mines
 Mounana

References

External links
  
  Alt URL

Uranium mines
Radioactive waste repositories
Mines in Gabon
Energy in Gabon
Nuclear reactors